Patrick James Considine (30 September 1875 – 20 June 1918) was an Australian rules footballer who played with Carlton in the Victorian Football League (VFL).

Notes

External links 

Pat Considine's profile at Blueseum

		
1875 births		
Australian rules footballers from Melbourne
Carlton Football Club players
1918 deaths
People from North Melbourne